Royal Huisman's  PHI was delivered in 2021.
Her exterior design was done by Cor D. Rover Design, the interior is by Lawson Robb. Along with PHI itself, a support vessel, the PHI Phantom, was built by Alia Yachts on its yard in Antalya, somewhat mirroring the PHI´s exterior style.

Sanctions 
The PHI arrived in London in March 2022 to be showcased for the 2022 World Superyacht Awards. Based on a set of sanctions in connection with the 2022 Russian invasion of Ukraine, the United Kingdoms government determined the PHI to belong to a sanctioned individual and ordered the yacht to be detained on 29 March 2022. The ownership of the yacht was not immediately revealed and, according to ministers, it was deliberately concealed by the actual owner. The ship is managed by a company based in Saint Kitts and Nevis. Government officials confirmed later, that they had been trying to identify the actual owner since 13 March 2022.

Specifications

 Length Overall: 
 Beam Overall: 
 Delivered: 2021
 Classification: 
 Maximum speed: 
 Accommodation: 
 Material: Aluminium hull & superstructure 
 Engine type: 2 × MTU - 12V 2000 M96L - with  each.
 Fuel capacity: 
 Naval architect: Van Oossanen Naval Architects
 Exterior designer: Cor D. Rover Design
 Interior designer: Lawson Robb

See also 
 List of motor yachts by length

References

2021 ships
Motor yachts
Ships built in the Netherlands